Jayson Christopher Tatum Sr. (born March 3, 1998) is an American professional basketball player for the Boston Celtics of the National Basketball Association (NBA). A McDonald's All-American in high school in Missouri, he played college basketball for the Duke Blue Devils. 

Tatum was selected with the third overall pick by the Boston Celtics in the 2017 NBA draft. A four-time NBA All-Star and two-time All-NBA selection, Tatum was named the NBA Eastern Conference Finals Most Valuable Player in 2022 and helped the Celtics reach the NBA Finals. He also won a gold medal on the 2020 U.S. Olympic team in Tokyo. He holds the record for most points scored in an NBA All-Star game, with 55.

High school career
Tatum attended Chaminade College Preparatory School in Creve Coeur, Missouri. As a freshman, he averaged 13.3 points and 6.4 rebounds per game and was named 2013 Metro Catholic Conference Co-Player of the year, leading the Red Devils to both (MCC) and Missouri District 2 crowns. As a sophomore in 2014, he averaged 26.0 points and 11.0 rebounds per game.

As a junior, Tatum averaged 25.9 points, 11.7 rebounds, and 3.4 assists per game, while earning Second-team Naismith Trophy All-American honors. In summer 2015, Tatum joined the St. Louis Eagles Amateur Athletic Union (AAU) team on the highly competitive Nike Elite Youth Basketball League (EYBL) Circuit. On July 11, the Eagles defeated future Duke teammate Harry Giles and Team CP3 74–73 in the Nike Peach Jam Semi-Finals with a game-winning buzzer-beater to advance to the championship game, where Tatum finished the game with 28 points and 5 rebounds. On July 12, Tatum tallied 24 points, 7 rebounds, and 4 blocks in a 104–77 loss to the Georgia Stars and future Duke one-and-done Wendell Carter Jr. in the 2015 Nike Peach Jam championship game. During the Circuit, Tatum led the EYBL in scoring with 26.5 points and 9.5 rebounds per game.

Prior to his senior year, Tatum made a verbal commitment to Duke University over North Carolina, Kentucky, and his mother and father's alma mater, Saint Louis University. Among his senior-year highlights were a 40-point, 17-rebound game in a 76–57 win over Bentonville High School and its star Malik Monk, a 46-point game against Huntington Prep and Miles Bridges at the Cancer Research Classic, and a final 40-point game against DeMatha Catholic High School and future #1 NBA draft pick Markelle Fultz at the 2016 HoopHall Classic.

As a senior in 2015–16 Tatum averaged 29.6 points and 9.1 rebounds and posted six 40-point games while leading Chaminade to its second Missouri Class 5A state championship. Tatum was selected to the 2016 McDonald's All-American Game in January 2016, where he won the Skills competition, and in the all-star game on March 30, 2016, at the United Center in Chicago, leading the East Team in scoring with 18 points and grabbing 8 rebounds in a 114–107 loss. In April, Tatum also played in the Jordan Brand Classic, where he scored 18 points in a 131–117 win against the West team. Tatum was named the 2016 Gatorade National Player of the Year.

Recruiting
Tatum was rated as a five-star recruit and considered one of the best prospects in the 2016 class. He was ranked as the No. 3 overall recruit behind Harry Giles and Josh Jackson and No. 2 small forward in the 2016 high school class.

College career

Before the start of 2016–17, Tatum missed 8 games due to a foot injury. On December 3, 2016 in his Duke debut, Tatum recorded 10 points in a 94–55 win over Maine. On December 6, 2016, Tatum tallied 22 points and 8 rebounds in an 84–74 victory over Florida at the Jimmy V Classic. On December 12, 2016, Tatum was named ACC freshman of the week. On December 21, 2016, Tatum scored 18 points, 8 rebounds, and 4 blocks in a 72–61 win over Elon.
On January 4, 2017, Tatum scored 19 points in a 110–57 victory over Georgia Tech. On January 7, he recorded 22 points and 6 rebounds in a 93–82 victory over Boston College. On January 21, Tatum scored 14 in a 70–58 win over Miami. On February 13, Tatum earned his second ACC freshman of the week honor. On February 15, he scored a season-high 28 points and had 8 rebounds in a 65–55 victory against Virginia. On February 18, 2017, Tatum scored 19 points in a 99–94 victory over Wake Forest. As the fifth seed in the ACC tournament, Duke defeated Clemson in the second round and Louisville in the quarterfinals. On March 10, Tatum scored 24 points in a win over rival North Carolina  in the semifinals. On March 11, Tatum tallied 19 points and 8 rebounds in a 75–69 victory against the Notre Dame Fighting Irish, earning the Blue Devils the ACC tournament championship.

Tatum was named to the All-ACC Tournament team, after averaging 22.0 points, 7.5 rebounds, and 1.5 steals per game for the Blue Devils. As the #2 seed entering the NCAA tournament, Duke defeated Troy University in the first round, but exited early in a second-round loss against South Carolina. Tatum averaged 16.5 points and 7.5 rebounds per game in the tournament. In his freshman season for Duke in 2016–17, Tatum played 29 games and averaged 16.8 points, 7.3 rebounds, 2.1 assist, and 1.3 steals per game, and was named to the ACC All-Freshman team & a third team All-ACC selection. Tatum had a successful freshman season at Duke, ranking fourth in made free throws (118), rebounds (fifth), and free throw percentage (849.).

At the conclusion of his freshman season Tatum opted to go directly into the 2017 NBA draft as a one-and-done, where he was projected as a first-round selection.

Professional career

Boston Celtics (2017–present)

2017–18 season: Rookie season 

Boston Celtics general manager Danny Ainge dealt away the team's No. 1 overall pick in the 2017 NBA draft to the Philadelphia 76ers in hopes that he could acquire another valuable draft pick and still target the player he actually wanted, Tatum. They selected him with the third overall pick, which they received from Philadelphia. He was the Celtics second straight No. 3 pick for a small forward, following Jaylen Brown in 2016. During the 2017 NBA Summer League event in Utah, he displayed his abilities to effect, averaging 18.7 points, 9.7 rebounds, 2.3 steals, and 2.0 assists in nearly 33 minutes of action. Later, in Las Vegas, Tatum produced similar results, averaging 17.7 points, 8.0 rebounds, 1.0 assists, and 0.8 blocks in nearly 32 minutes of action in the three games he was allowed to play. He was named to the All-Summer League Second Team alongside Bryn Forbes, Cheick Diallo, Wayne Selden Jr., and Kyle Kuzma.

In his NBA debut, Tatum recorded a double-double with 14 points and 10 rebounds as the team's starting power forward in a 102–99 loss to the Cleveland Cavaliers. Tatum then recorded a season-high 24 points in a win over the New York Knicks on October 24, 2017. He was named the Eastern Conference's Rookie of The Month for December 2017.

The Celtics finished the season with a record of 55–27, entering the 2018 NBA playoffs as the second seed in the Eastern Conference. In Game 1 of the first-round series against the seventh seed Milwaukee Bucks, Tatum recorded a double-double with 19 points and 10 rebounds. In Game 4 he broke his playoff-high with 21 points, and then broke it again in Game 6 with 22. The Celtics defeated the Bucks in Game 7 by a score of 112–96, with Tatum scoring 20 points.

In Game 1 of the second-round series against the third-seed Philadelphia 76ers, Tatum had a then career-high 28 points in a 117–101 win, becoming the first Celtics rookie to score 25 or more points in a playoff game since Larry Bird during the 1980 NBA playoffs, also against the 76ers. After leading the Celtics with 24 points in a Game 3 overtime win in Philadelphia, he became the first Celtics rookie to score 20 points in five straight playoff games. Bird held the previous record of four. At the end of his playoff run, he joined Kareem Abdul-Jabbar as the only rookies in playoff history to record 10 games of 20 or more points scored during their first playoff runs; LeBron James would praise Tatum's work there, stating: "He's built for stardom."

On May 22, 2018, Tatum was named to the NBA All-Rookie Team (First Team).

2018–19 season: Sophomore season
In the Celtics 2018–19 season opener, Tatum scored 23 points, 9 rebounds, and 3 assist in a 105–87 win against the Philadelphia 76ers. On October 20, he scored 24 points and 14 rebounds in a 103–101 victory over the New York Knicks. On October 25, Tatum scored 24 points and 6 rebounds in a 101–95 win over the Oklahoma City Thunder. On November 16, Tatum recorded 21 points and 7 rebounds in a 123–116 overtime win against the Toronto Raptors. On December 25, he scored 23 points and 10 rebounds in a 121–114 overtime win against the Philadelphia 76ers. On February 5, Tatum tallied 25 points and 7 rebounds in a 103–96 victory against the Cleveland Cavaliers. On March 6, Tatum scored 24 points, 3 rebounds and 2 assist in a 126–120 win against the Sacramento Kings. During NBA All-Star Weekend, he won the Skills Challenge competition.

2019–20 season: First All-Star and All-NBA appearances

On December 22, 2019, Tatum scored a then career-high 39 points, along with 12 rebounds, in a 119–93 win over the Charlotte Hornets. He would exceed that with a then career-high 41 points against the New Orleans Pelicans in a 140–105 win on January 11, 2020. On January 30, Tatum was named an NBA All-Star for the first time in his career, being selected as an Eastern Conference reserve. On February 13, Tatum would again score 39 points, while playing 47 minutes and leading Boston to a 141–133 double overtime win over the Los Angeles Clippers. On February 23, he matched his then career-high 41 points in a 114–112 loss to the Los Angeles Lakers. As the season was halted by the COVID-19 pandemic, Tatum would shoot 2–18 against the Milwaukee Bucks on July 31, but he would come back the next game scoring 34 points on 11–22 shooting in a 128–124 win over the Portland Trail Blazers on August 2.  He was named to the All-NBA Third Team and his first selection of his career.

In the 2020 NBA playoffs, the Celtics were able to advance to the Eastern Conference Finals for the second time in Tatum's three years in the NBA following series victories over the Philadelphia 76ers and Toronto Raptors in four and seven games, respectively. However, Boston was eliminated in those Conference Finals by the Miami Heat in six games. In Game 1, with the Celtics trailing by two in the closing seconds, Tatum's game-tying dunk attempt was blocked by Heat center Bam Adebayo with 4.8 seconds left and prompted Miami to a 117–114 victory.

2020–21 season: Play-in appearance and first round exit
On November 22, 2020, Tatum and the Celtics agreed to a rookie maximum extension of five years, worth $195 million. On the opening night of the season on December 23, 2020, Tatum totaled 30 points and seven rebounds, alongside a game-winning three-pointer, in a 122–121 win against the Milwaukee Bucks. On January 3, 2021, Tatum had 24 points and a career-high 12 assists and made another game-winning basket in a 122–120 win against the Detroit Pistons. The next day, Tatum scored a season-high 40 points in a 126–114 win against the Toronto Raptors. On January 9, 2021, it was confirmed that Tatum tested positive for COVID-19 and missed multiple games. On 23 February, Tatum was named an Eastern Conference reserve for the 2021 NBA All-Star Game. It was his second All-Star game in a row.

On April 9, Tatum had a then career-high 53 points, 16 made field goals, and 15 made free throws in a 145–136 win against the Minnesota Timberwolves. With his career night, Tatum was the youngest Celtics player to score 50+ points; he also scored the third-highest number of points in a Celtics uniform, behind Larry Bird and Kevin McHale, and became the second player in Celtics history to score 50+ points and grab 10+ rebounds since Bird did it back in November 1989. Tatum and Zach LaVine of the Chicago Bulls became the second pair of players in the 2020–21 season to score 50+ points on the same day. On April 19, Tatum recorded his first career triple-double with 14 points, 13 rebounds, and 10 assists in a 102–96 loss to the Chicago Bulls.

On May 4, Tatum brought the Celtics back from a 32-point deficit against the San Antonio Spurs, a performance that produced the third-largest comeback in NBA history and gave Tatum a career high of 60 points, tied for the highest points total by a Celtics player (Larry Bird). Tatum was one of three players to score 60+ points without a single turnover and was named Eastern Conference Player of the Week after averaging 42.7 points per game, 6.0 assists per game, and 6.0 rebounds per game.

In the first game of the play-in tournament on May 18, Tatum scored 50 points, guiding the Celtics to a victory over the Washington Wizards and cementing the team as the seven seed in the Eastern Conference into the 2021 NBA playoffs; Kemba Walker, Tatum's teammate, had 29 points while only one other player (Tristan Thompson) had ten or more points. Tatum set the record for most points in a single play-in tournament game, became one of an elite list of players who scored 50+ points in play-ins/playoffs, and singlehandedly outscored the Wizards in the third quarter and part of the fourth, and was a perfect 17/17 from the free throw line.

In Game 3 of the first-round series against the Brooklyn Nets and their "Big Three" (Kevin Durant, James Harden, and Kyrie Irving), Tatum scored 50 points on 50% shooting (16/30), and put up 6 rebounds, 7 assists, and 2 steals. With the feat, Tatum achieved a variety of records, becoming the first player in NBA playoff history to score 50 points after scoring single digits the previous game; he also passed 1,000 points in the playoffs and became the fifth-highest postseason point scorer at age 23 or younger in NBA history as well as the first Celtics player since Isaiah Thomas to score 50+ points in the NBA playoffs and the third youngest player in NBA playoff history to reach that mark in a single game. In terms of franchise records, Tatum became just the sixth person in Celtics history to score 50+ points in a playoff game; he also became the only player in NBA history to score 50+ points more than once in the regular season, 50+ points in a play-in game, and 50+ points in the playoffs. Despite losing to the Nets in five games, Tatum set a Celtics franchise record for most points scored in a three-game span in the playoffs, with a combined total of 122 points.

2021–22 season: All-NBA First Team selection and first NBA Finals
Tatum led the league in Plus-minus for the first time in his 5th season, cementing his status as one of the most valuable players in the NBA.
On October 25, 2021, in a 140–129 overtime victory over the Charlotte Hornets, Tatum recorded 41 points, 7 rebounds, and 8 assists to lead the Celtics to their first win of the season. On January 23, 2022, Tatum scored a then season-high 51 points along with 10 rebounds, 7 assists, and a career-high 9 three-pointers in a blowout 116–87 win over the Washington Wizards. On February 3, Tatum was selected for his third consecutive All-Star appearance. On March 3, Tatum scored 21 of his 37 points in the fourth quarter along with 6 rebounds and 5 assists in a 120–107 win over the Memphis Grizzlies. The following game, Tatum topped his season-high with 54 points, 34 of them in the second half in a 126–120 win over the Brooklyn Nets. This was the fourth time Tatum had netted 50+ points in a game in his career, tying Larry Bird for the most 50-point games in Celtics history. On March 7, Tatum was named Eastern Conference Player of the Week after averaging 41.3 points per game, 6.3 rebounds per game, and 5.0 assists per game. The next game, Tatum scored 16 of his 44 points in the fourth quarter in a 115–101 win over the Charlotte Hornets. On March 18, in a 126–97 win over the Sacramento Kings, Tatum and Jaylen Brown each scored at least 30 points in the same game for the fourth time in the season and eight time overall; this tied the record of most such games with fellow Celtics' Larry Bird and Kevin McHale, who also recorded four such games in the 1986–87 NBA season. The following game, in a 124–104 victory over the Denver Nuggets, Tatum and Jaylen Brown broke the record by both scoring 30 points with over 60% shooting from the field. On March 28, Tatum became the first player in franchise history to be named Player of the Week in back-to-back weeks.

On April 17, during Game 1 of the first round of the playoffs, Tatum logged 31 points and eight assists. He hit the game-winning layup to defeat the Brooklyn Nets, 115–114. On April 23, Tatum scored 39 points along with 5 rebounds, 6 assists and a playoff career-high 6 steals in a 109–103 Game 3 win. Two days later, Tatum and the Celtics swept the Nets 116–112, to advance to the 2nd round of the playoffs. On 9 May, in Game 4 of the Eastern Conference Semifinals, Tatum recorded 30 points, 13 rebounds and 5 assists in a 116–108 win over the reigning champions Milwaukee Bucks to tie the series at 2–2. In Game 6 of the series, on May 13, Tatum scored 46 points along with 9 rebounds and 4 assists to lead the Celtics to a 108–95 win and force a game 7 in Boston. Two days later in Game 7, Tatum posted 23 points, 6 rebounds and 8 assists in a 109–81 win over the Bucks, thus securing the Celtics a place in the Eastern Conference Finals. On 23 May, in Game 4 of the Eastern Conference Finals, Tatum recorded 31 points, 8 rebounds and 5 assists in a 102–82 blowout win over the Miami Heat to tie the series at 2–2. In the decisive Game 7 of the series, he tallied 26 points, 10 rebounds and 6 assists in a 100–96 win over Miami to lead the Celtics to their first NBA Finals appearance since 2010. Tatum was named the inaugural Eastern Conference Finals MVP after averaging 25.0 points, 8 rebounds and 5.5 assists per game in the series. During Game 1 of the Finals, Tatum led the Celtics to a 120–108 win over the Golden State Warriors with 13 assists, the most assists recorded by a player in his Finals debut. The Celtics took a 2–1 series lead, but eventually lost in 6 games. Tatum set the all-time NBA record with 100 turnovers in a single postseason.

2022–23 season: All-Star Game MVP
On November 30, 2022, Tatum scored 49 points, grabbed 11 rebounds and made 8 three-pointers in a 134–121 win over the Miami Heat. He became the youngest player in NBA history to make 900 three-pointers, doing so at 24 years old and surpassing the previous record set by Bradley Beal at 25 years old. Tatum became the first player in NBA History to record multiple games of at least 45 points, 10 rebounds and eight three-pointers made. He also became the sixth player in NBA history to have multiple games with 45 points or more with 10 or more rebounds while only committing one turnover or fewer, joining the company of Anthony Davis (six such games), Michael Jordan (three), Giannis Antetokounmpo (three), Kobe Bryant (two) and Carmelo Anthony (two). He was named Eastern Conference Player of the Month, averaging 31.6 points per game, 7.8 rebounds per game, and 4.5 assists per game in October and November. On December 13, Tatum recorded 44 points, 9 rebounds and 6 assists in a 122–118 overtime win over the Los Angeles Lakers. On December 25, Tatum scored 20 of his 41 points in the third quarter, along with 7 rebounds, 5 assists and 3 steals in a 139–118 blowout win over the Milwaukee Bucks. He and Jaylen Brown (29 points) combined for 70 points in a game for the eighth time in their careers. 

On January 5, 2023, Tatum put up his second career triple-double with 29 points, 14 rebounds, and 10 assists in a 124–95 win over the Dallas Mavericks. On January 11, Tatum posted 31 points, 10 rebounds and four assists in a 125–114 win against the New Orleans Pelicans. It was the 10th time that Tatum and Brown (41 points) combined to score 70+ points. The Celtics are undefeated in those games. On January 16, Tatum scored a season-high 51 points, along with nine rebounds and five assists on 15-of-23 shooting, 7-of-12 from three, 14-of-14 from the free throw line in a 130–118 win over the Charlotte Hornets. He also surpassed Larry Bird for the most 50-point regular season games in Celtics history. On January 19, in a rematch of the 2022 NBA Finals, Tatum put up 34 points alongside a career-high 19 rebounds, six assists and three steals in a 121–118 overtime win over the Golden State Warriors. He became the first Celtic to record 30+ points, 15+ rebounds, and 5+ assists in a game since Paul Pierce in 2002. Tatum also became the 10th player in NBA history to reach 9,000 career points before the age of 25. On January 26, Tatum was named an Eastern Conference starter for the 2023 NBA All-Star Game, marking his fourth overall selection and first as a starter. 

On February 10, Tatum scored 41 points on 5-of-10 shooting from three-point range in a 127–116 win against the Charlotte Hornets, becoming the youngest player at 24 years and 244 days old to reach 1,000 career three-pointers. On February 19, playing for the NBA All-Star Game, Tatum notched 55 points, 10 rebounds, and six assists, breaking Anthony Davis's previous All-Star record high of 52 points, and also won the game's Most Valuable Player award. He also became the first player in NBA history to score at least 50 points in the regular season, the playoffs, and the All-Star Game. On February 25, Tatum made a game-winning three-pointer in a 110–107 win over the Philadelphia 76ers.

On March 18, 2023, Tatum became the first player of the season to reach 2,000 points over a 117-118 loss to the Utah Jazz

National team career
Tatum played in the 2014 FIBA Under-17 World Championship and 2015 FIBA Under-19 World Championship, making the Eurobasket.com All-World Championship U19 Second Team. On December 25, Tatum posted 41 points, 9 rebounds and 6 assists in a 122–118 overtime win over the Los Angeles Lakers.

Representing Team USA at the 2016 Nike Hoop Summit, Tatum saw 16 minutes, 57 seconds of action, scoring 14 points, pulling down 4 rebounds, and also had 2 assists, 2 steals, and 1 block.

Tatum was selected as one of the players on Team USA at the 2020 Summer Olympics in Tokyo, Japan, which was postponed to 2021 due to the COVID-19 pandemic. He helped Team USA win the gold medal, averaging 15.2 points, 3.3 rebounds, 1.2 assists, 0.5 steals and 1.2 blocks while shooting 49.3% from the field in six games. He was the second highest scorer on the team to Kevin Durant.

Career statistics

NBA

Regular season

|-
| style="text-align:left;"|
| style="text-align:left;"|Boston
| 80 || 80 || 30.5 || .475 || .434 || .826 || 5.0 || 1.6 || 1.0 || .7 || 13.9
|-
| style="text-align:left;"|
| style="text-align:left;"|Boston
| 79 || 79 || 31.1 || .450 || .373 || .855 || 6.0 || 2.1 || 1.1 || .7 || 15.7
|-
| style="text-align:left;"|
| style="text-align:left;"|Boston
| 66 || 66 || 34.3 || .450 || .403 || .812 || 7.0 || 3.0 || 1.4 || .9 || 23.4
|-
| style="text-align:left;"|
| style="text-align:left;"|Boston
| 64 || 64 || 35.8 || .459 || .386 || .868 || 7.4 || 4.3 || 1.2 || .5 || 26.4
|-
| style="text-align:left;"|
| style="text-align:left;"|Boston
| 76 || 76 || 35.9 || .453 || .353 || .853 || 8.0 || 4.4 || 1.0 || .6 || 26.9
|- class="sortbottom"
| style="text-align:center;" colspan="2"|Career
| 365 || 365 || 33.4 || .456 || .383 || .844 || 6.6 || 3.0 || 1.1 || .7 || 20.9
|- class="sortbottom"
| style="text-align:center;" colspan="2"| All-Star
| 4 || 3 || 21.4 || .585 || .371 || .500 || 4.8 || 5.3 || 2.3 || .3 || 22.5

Playoffs

|-
| style="text-align:left;"|2018
| style="text-align:left;"|Boston
| 19 || 19 || 35.9 || .471 || .324 || .845 || 4.4 || 2.7 || 1.2 || .5 || 18.5
|-
| style="text-align:left;"| 2019
| style="text-align:left;"| Boston
| 9 || 9 || 32.8 || .438 || .323 || .744 || 6.7 || 1.9 || 1.1 || .8 || 15.2
|-
| style="text-align:left;"| 2020
| style="text-align:left;"| Boston
| 17 || 17 || 40.6 || .434 || .373 || .813 || 10.0 || 5.0 || 1.0 || 1.2 || 25.7
|-
| style="text-align:left;"| 2021
| style="text-align:left;"| Boston
| 5 || 5 || 37.0 || .423 || .389 || .918 || 5.8 || 4.6 || 1.2 || 1.6 || 30.6
|-
| style="text-align:left;"| 2022
| style="text-align:left;"| Boston
| 24 || 24 || 41.0 || .426 || .393 || .800 || 6.7 || 6.2 || 1.2 || .9 || 25.6
|- class="sortbottom"
| style="text-align:center;" colspan="2"|Career
| 74 || 74 || 38.3 || .438 || .372 || .820 || 6.8 || 4.4 || 1.1 || .9 || 22.9

College

|-
| style="text-align:left;"|2016–17
| style="text-align:left;"|Duke
| 29 || 27 || 33.3 || .452 || .342 || .849 || 7.3 || 2.1 || 1.3 || 1.1 || 16.8

Personal life
Tatum is the son of Justin Tatum and Brandy Cole. Justin Tatum played basketball at Saint Louis University and is a gym teacher and basketball coach at Christian Brothers College High School in St. Louis, from which he graduated in 1997, approximately a year before Jayson's birth; Tatum's father was previously the coach and athletics director at Soldan International Studies High School for six years. Tatum was born when his parents were both 19-year-old undergraduates; his mother Brandy graduated from Saint Louis University School of Law and is now a practicing attorney in the St. Louis area. Tatum is the godson of former NBA player Larry Hughes, who was his father's high school and college teammate; he is also a cousin of former NBA player and current Los Angeles Clippers head coach Tyronn Lue.

Tatum is a Christian, crediting Jesus for his success and career.

While in high school at Chaminade College Preparatory School, Tatum was good friends with future NHL forward Matthew Tkachuk of the Florida Panthers, as the two were placed in the same gym class. Tatum is also good friends with former Duke teammate and current NBA player Harry Giles.

Tatum's son, Deuce, was born on December 6, 2017.

Endorsements 
, Tatum is a spokesperson for Imo's Pizza. On June 21, 2019, Tatum signed with the Jordan Brand. He is also endorsed by Subway and Gatorade.

References

External links

 Duke Blue Devils bio
 USA Basketball bio

1998 births
2019 FIBA Basketball World Cup players
American men's basketball players
Basketball players at the 2020 Summer Olympics
Basketball players from St. Louis
Boston Celtics draft picks
Boston Celtics players
Chaminade College Preparatory School (Missouri) alumni
Duke Blue Devils men's basketball players
Living people
McDonald's High School All-Americans
Medalists at the 2020 Summer Olympics
National Basketball Association All-Stars
Olympic gold medalists for the United States in basketball
Small forwards
United States men's national basketball team players